Félix Odoart Anatole Pierre Xavier Le Double (14 August 1848 – 22 October 1913) was a French anatomist and physician. He studied and taught comparative anatomy and took a special interest in anthropology and differences in anatomy and took an evolutionary view on these variations.

Le Double was born in Rocroi, Ardennes where his father was owner of the insurance company Compagnie du Soleil. He studied at the lycaeum in Honfleur where his family had moved to and then went to study medicine in Paris.  He graduated with medals and honours and served in the Franco-Prussian War. He then worked in Paris and submitted a thesis in 1876 on occlusion caused by urogenital fistulas. He became a surgeon at the Hospice Général of Tours, and then a professor of the medical faculty of Tours.

Le Double took a special interest in comparative anatomy and in anthropology. He took a special interest in anatomical variations within humans.  He was one of the first French researchers to promote the field of paleopathology.

Le Double wrote treatises on human musculature and anthropology. He also examined Rabelais as an anatomist. Le Double died of accidental carbon monoxide poisoning at home in Tours in 1913.

References

External links 
 Du Kleisis génital et principalement de l'occlusion vaginale et vulvaire dans les fistules uro-génitales (Thesis, 1876)
 Rabelais anatomiste et physiologiste (1899)
 Traité des variations du système musculaire de l'homme et de leur signification au point de vue de l'anthropologie zoologique. Part I Part II (1897)

1848 births
1913 deaths
French anatomists
People from Ardennes (department)
University of Paris alumni
Medical anthropologists